is a Japanese independent animator who, after leaving a career as a background artist at an animation studio, directs, writes, edits, animates, creates the model sheets and background art for and sometimes produces his own short films and has worked on many commissions such as music videos, television advertisements, title sequences and station idents, both on his own and under or with other directors. He is also a regular illustrator of children's literature and textbooks.

His animation spans a variety of media, his earliest independent works mixing clay painting and stop motion with cels, but has latterly come to concentrate on traditional animation. Two of his most famous and acclaimed films are the Academy Award for Best Animated Short Film-nominated and Cristal d'Annecy–winning Mount Head and the Ottawa Grand Prize and Ōfuji Noburō Award–winning A Country Doctor. His 2011 short film Muybridge's Strings was one of five animated shorts nominated for the Genie Award for Best Animated Short Film at the 32nd Genie Awards in 2012.

Biography 
Yamamura was born in Nagoya and studied painting at Tokyo Zokei University. His 2002 movie Mt. Head (Atama Yama) won the short film award for the Annecy International Animated Film Festival, the Grand Prize at the 2004 World Festival of Animated Films - Animafest Zagreb and was nominated for the Academy Award for Animated Short Film. Yamamura won the 2007 Ottawa Grand Prix with his animated adaptation of Franz Kafka's "A Country Doctor." Both of the films were included in the Animation Show of Shows.

Yamamura also held an exhibition at the Aichi Expo 2005.

Filmography

References

External links 
  

 
 

1964 births
Japanese animated film directors
Japanese animated film producers
Clay animation
Japanese animators
Anime directors
Japanese film directors
Japanese film editors
Japanese anime producers
Living people
People from Nagoya
Stop motion animators
Background artists
Japanese children's book illustrators
Tokyo Zokei University alumni
Academic staff of Tokyo University of the Arts